Voice of the Xtabay is the first studio album by Peruvian soprano Yma Sumac. It was released in 1950 by Capitol Records. It was produced and composed by Les Baxter, along with Moisés Vivanco and John Rose. Sumac sings on the album, accompanied by ethnic percussion and musical variations influenced by the music of Peru. Sumac had a notable vocal range, of about five octaves.

The album entered several Billboard charts on the year of its release.

The songs Virgin of the Sun God, High Andes! and Earthquake were used in the 1954 film Secret of the Incas which featured Sumac as Kori-Tica.

The album was reissued in the UK in 1956 with different artwork.

The album quickly sold 500,000 copies, and was No. 1 on Variety’s best-seller list at the end of 1950, surpassing albums by Bing Crosby and Ethel Merman.

Track listing

References

External links 

SunVirgin.com
Yma-Sumac.com

1950 debut albums
Yma Sumac albums
Capitol Records albums
Albums produced by Les Baxter